Mike Pickering (born 21 February 1954) is an English musician and DJ.

Career
Pickering was a DJ at The Haçienda's Nude and Hot nights, and later Shine. He worked for Factory Records, where he signed Happy Mondays, To Hell with Burgundy and James, among others.  With Hillegonda Rietveld, he was joint founder, writer and producer of Quando Quango, and he later founded M People, for whom he wrote and produced many songs and played saxophone live.

Pickering now works as A&R within the Columbia label of Sony BMG, where he works with the Gossip, Calvin Harris, Kasabian, and the Ting Tings.

In other media
Pickering appeared as himself in the film 24 Hour Party People. He supports Manchester City Football Club, and appeared in the documentary film about the club, Blue Moon Rising in 2010 alongside Noel Gallagher.

References

1958 births
Living people
English DJs
English rock saxophonists
British male saxophonists
English record producers
English songwriters
A&R people
People from Accrington
21st-century saxophonists
21st-century British male musicians
British male songwriters